Bleeker is a Dutch occupational surname. Bleeker is an old spelling of (linnen)bleker ("linen bleacher"). People with the surname include:

 Alex Bleeker (born 1986), American musician and guitarist
 Bernhard Bleeker (1881–1968), German sculptor
 C. Jouco Bleeker (1898–1983), Dutch phenomenologist of religion
 Eppie Bleeker (born 1949), Dutch speed skater
 Horst Bleeker (born 1938), German swimmer
 Johan Bleeker (born 1942), Dutch space technology scientist
Named after him: the main-belt asteroid 9693 Bleeker
 Kevin Bleeker (born 1993), Dutch basketball player 
 Lili Bleeker (1897–1985), Dutch physicist
 Mel Bleeker (1920–1996), American football player
 Piet Bleeker (born 1928), Dutch long-distance runner
 Pieter Bleeker (1819–1874), a Dutch medical doctor, ichthyologist and herpetologist
Named after him: Bleeker smoothbelly sardinella, Bleeker's whipray, Bleeker's worm-eel
Fictional characters
 Paulie Bleeker, a character in the film Juno played by Michael Cera

Other meanings
 Bleeker (band), a Canadian rock band named after Bleeker Street, Orillia, Ontario
 Bleeker: The Rechargeable Dog, a comic strip syndicated by Universal Press Syndicate

See also
 Bleecker (disambiguation)
 Bleaker

References

Dutch-language surnames
Occupational surnames